A blood diamond is a diamond mined in a war zone and sold to finance military operations.

Blood diamond may also refer to:
Blood Diamond, 2006 film about the blood diamond trade
Blood Diamonds (documentary), 2006 TV documentary about the blood diamond trade
Bloodpop, a musician, record producer, and songwriter previously called Blood Diamonds